Dave Nolan (born 19 June 1988) is a rugby union player from Ireland. He primarily plays as a lock. Nolan currently plays for Doncaster Knights in the English Championship. He has previously played for Connacht in Ireland and Bourgoin in France.

Nolan made his first appearance for Connacht in the 2009–10 Celtic League. His debut came on 25 April 2010, away against Welsh side Scarlets. Nolan started and played the full 80 minutes for his side as they lost 58–10. He also made an appearance for Connacht against the Newport Gwent Dragons as a replacement in the 2010–11 Celtic League, playing for 20 minutes.

During his time with Connacht, Nolan suffered a number of long-term injuries that kept him out of the game for long periods. He missed the 2011–12 season after breaking his leg in a pre-season game with Exeter. Another break to the same leg in training occurred shortly before the 2012–13 season, and caused Nolan to also miss that season.

In April 2014, it was announced that Nolan's contract would not be renewed and he would be leaving the province at the end of the season. In June 2014 he signed for French Pro D2 side Bourgoin.

References

1988 births
Living people
Connacht Rugby players
Galwegians RFC players
Irish rugby union players
Rugby union locks
Rugby union players from County Galway